Andrzej Tomasz Towiański (January 1, 1799 – May 13, 1878) was a Polish philosopher and messianic religious leader.

Life

Towiański was born in Antoszwińce, a village near Vilnius, which after Partitions of Poland belonged to the Russian Empire. He was the charismatic leader of the Towiańskiite sect, known also as Koło Sprawy Bożej (the Circle of God's Cause). In 1839 he experienced a vision in which the Holy Ghost and the Virgin Mary urged him to act as a messenger of the Apocalypse. The Poles, the French—particularly Napoleon—and Jews were to play leading roles. Among those influenced by his thinking were the Polish Romantic poets Adam Mickiewicz, Juliusz Słowacki, and Seweryn Goszczyński.

His extraordinary influence on Mickiewicz, a leader of the Polish emigre community, was divisive, and some members of the community accused him of being a Russian agent.

He died in Zurich.

See also
History of philosophy in Poland (Messianism period)
List of Poles

Footnotes

External links 
 
 
 Dr Pavel Zahradník: Odkud přišli starší bratři?. Te Deum. 3/2009 

1799 births
1878 deaths
People from Šalčininkai District Municipality
19th-century Polish philosophers
People from the Russian Empire of Polish descent
Polish messianism